Motemajra is a Village on Chandigarh- Patiala road in state of Punjab, India. It is situated near Banur town in district SAS Nagar, Mohali. As per 2011 census of government of India population of this village is 2160 out of which number of male and female was 1143 and 1017 respectively. (S. No. 92).

References 

Villages in Sahibzada Ajit Singh Nagar district
Birdwatching sites in India